Hyundai Rotem (founded in 1977) is a South Korean company that manufactures rolling stock, defense products and plant equipment.  It is a part of the Hyundai Motor Group.  Its name was changed from Rotem to Hyundai Rotem in December 2007 to reflect the parent company.

History
The company was founded in 1977. In 1999, the company changed its name to Korea Rolling Stock Corporation (KOROS) as a result of the merging between three major rolling stock divisions: Hanjin Heavy Industries, Daewoo Heavy Industries and Hyundai Precision & Industries. The company subsequently changed its name to Railroading Technology System, or Rotem, on 1 January 2002. It adopted its current name in December 2007 to reflect its current owner.

Hyundai Rotem currently employs 3,800 people and exports to 50 countries worldwide.

Railway products 
Notable projects include supplying most of South Korea's rolling stock, which include Korail's KTX high speed trains, electric multiple units (EMUs), and electric locomotives. Other products in South Korea include supplying all of Seoul Metro, Seoul Metropolitan Rapid Transit, Busan Metro Lines, and Shinbundang Line's rolling stock.  International products include Hong Kong MTR's K-Stock and R-Stock EMUs, commuter EMUs for Taiwan, trains for the New Delhi Metro, and automated trains for the Canada Line in Vancouver, Canada.  It delivered 120 Silverliner V commuter trains for SEPTA Regional Rail in the Philadelphia, Pennsylvania area.

Trams and light rail vehicles 
 Canada – Edmonton LRT Valley Line (40 low-floor LRVs, on order)
 Indonesia – Jakarta LRT high-floor LRVs
 Philippines – Manila LRT Line 1 1100 class high-floor LRVs (with Adtranz)
 Poland – Warsaw tram network (123 tramcars)
 Turkey – Adana Metro high-floor LRVs
 Turkey – Istanbul LRT T4 high-floor LRVs
 Turkey – Izmir trams

High-speed rail 
 Korail KTX-I
 HSR-350X
 Korail KTX-Sancheon
 HEMU-430X
 Korail KTX-Eum (EMU-260, EMU-320)

Diesel multiple units 
 Iran – Islamic Republic of Iran Railways railbus
 Ireland – Iarnród Éireann 22000 Class
 Philippines – PNR Metro Commuter Line DMUs
 Thailand – State Railway of Thailand (SRT) APD.20 and APD.60 DMUs (then by Daewoo)
 Syria – Syrian Railways
 South Korea – Korail Saemaul-ho diesel-hydraulic multiple units

Electric multiple units 
 Australia – NSW TrainLink D sets linking Sydney with the Blue Mountains, Central Coast, Newcastle, Illawarra, Wollongong, Shellharbour and South Coast district areas
 Brazil – CPTM (Sao Paulo) EMU 9500 series
 Brazil – Supervia (Rio de Janeiro) EMU 2500 series
 Malaysia – KTM Class 91
 Malaysia – KTM Class 83
 New Zealand – FP class for Greater Wellington Regional Council, for use in Wellington
 Singapore - SMRT C151 refurbishment, Hyundai Rotem CJ151 for Jurong Region Line
 South Korea – Incheon Airport Maglev (Ecobee)
 South Korea – Seoul Metro Line 5 5000 series
 South Korea – Seoul Metro Line 6 6000 series
 South Korea – Seoul Metro Line 7 7000 series
 South Korea – Seoul Metro Line 8 8000 series
 South Korea - Busan Metro Class 1000 (Hyundai Seiko), Class 2000 (Hanjin Industrial) and Class 3000 (Rotem)
 South Korea – ITX-Saemaeul EMU-150 (Korean long distance trains, max )
 Taiwan – TRA EMU500 series (first produced by Daewoo, then by Hyundai Rotem after merger), EMU600 series (mechanically identical, built only by Hyundai Rotem), EMU900 series
 Turkey - Marmaray E32000 series
 Turkey - Başkentray E23000 series
 Turkey - İZBAN E22100 series
 United States – Silverliner V for SEPTA Regional Rail (Philadelphia) and RTD Commuter Rail (Denver)
 Ukraine – HRCS2 for Ukrainian Railways

Metro cars 

 Brazil – Sao Paulo Metro, Line 4
 Brazil – Salvador Metro
 Canada – Vancouver SkyTrain Canada Line Hyundai Rotem EMU
 Greece – Athens Metro EMUs (for lines 2, 3 and Athens Airport service)
 Hong Kong – MTR
 K-train (with Mitsubishi Heavy Industries) for Tseung Kwan O line since 2010 and Tung Chung line from 2006 (served on the Kwun Tong line from 2002-2009 due to United Goninan's lack of knowledge of repairing Rotem trains for the Tseung Kwan O line's bendy tracks)
 R-train for East Rail line (entered service since 6 February 2021, have replaced the Metro-Cammell EMU fleet since 2022)
 India – Delhi Metro
Phase 1- broad gauge EMUs; Red Line (Delhi Metro), Yellow Line (Delhi Metro) (erstwhile user), Blue Line (Delhi Metro)
Phase 2- standard gauge EMUs; Green Line (Delhi Metro), Violet Line (Delhi Metro)
Phase 3- standard gauge driverless EMUs; Pink Line (Delhi Metro), Magenta Line (Delhi Metro), Grey Line (Delhi Metro)
 India – Bangalore Metro EMUs
 India – Hyderabad Metro EMUs
 India – Nagpur Metro EMUs
 Kazakhstan – Almaty Metro EMUs
 Malaysia – Kuala Lumpur Metro Line 12
 Philippines – Manila LRT Line 2 2000 class (with Toshiba for electrical components), Manila MRT Line 7 000 class
 South Korea – 2000 series EMU for Seoul Metro, SMRT, Korail, DJET, DGSC, BTC, AREX, Incheon Metro, and Daegu Metro Daegu Metro Line 2
 Taiwan - Taoyuan Metro Green Line EMUs
 Taiwan - Taipei Metro
 Taiwan - Kaohsiung Metro Red Line extension EMUs
 Tunisia - Sahel Metro
 Turkey – Istanbul Metro Line 2, Line 6, Line 7 and Line 8

Electric locomotives 
 South Korea– Korail 8000, 8100, 8200, 8500
 Turkey – TCDD E68000 (only first 8 locomotives, later 72 built by TÜLOMSAŞ under Hyundai Rotem license)

Diesel-electric locomotives 
 Bangladesh – 2900, 3000 series locomotives
 Korea – Korail class 4400 (GT18B-M), 7000, 7100, 7200, 7300, 7400, 7500 (GT26CW series)

Push-pull coaches 
 Taiwan – TRA: E1000 push-pull trainsets (by Hyundai Precision, Alstom, and Union Carriage & Wagon)
 United States – Rotem bi-level push-pull cars
 MBTA BTC-4D and CTC-5 cars
 Metrolink Guardian cars BTC-5
 Tri-Rail BTC-5 push-pull cars

Defense products 

 K1A1 Main Battle Tank
 K2 Black Panther Main Battle Tank
 K1 Armoured Recovery Vehicle
 Decon Machinery
 60-Ton Heavy Equipment Transporter (HET)
 K1 Tank Gunnery Trainer
 Depot Maintenance
 Integrated Logistics System

Plant and Machinery 
 Mechanical Press, Hydraulic Press, Auto Racking System
 Electric Arc Furnace – Steel
 Ladle Furnace
 Cranes
 Passenger Boarding Bridges
 Plant construction

Clients 
 TransLink, BC, Canada - SkyTrain Canada Line, this line is run privately by ProTrans BC.
 MTR
 Regional Transportation District, Denver, CO
 SEPTA
 Islamic Republic of Iran Railways
 Seoul Metro, SMRT, Korail, BUTC, DGSC, DJeT
 Supervia, Rio de Janeiro suburban trains
 Attiko Metro S.A.
 General Directorate of Railways, Harbours & Airports at the Ministry of Transport of Turkey
 ViaQuatro, Sao Paulo Metro – Line 4 private company operator
 CPTM, São Paulo metropolitan trains company.
 Light Rail Transit Authority – A GOCC which owns and/or operates the Manila LRTA System
 Philippine National Railways – A GOCC which operates PNR Northrail and Southrail
 SMC-MRT7 Incorporated - A private company which owns and operates the Manila Line 7
 Metrolink in Southern California – A commuter rail system serving the Los Angeles Metropolitan area.
 Transdev Wellington – passenger rail services in Wellington, New Zealand.
 Tri-Rail – A commuter rail system in the greater Miami, FL area
 Bangladesh Railway – supplying them with diesel locomotives
 Ukrainian Railways
 MBTA
 BMRCL India
 DMRC India
 Hyderabad Metro India
 Iarnród Éireann Ireland
 Shenzhen Metro China
 SMRT Corporation Singapore
 Land Transport Authority Singapore
 MRT Corp Malaysia
 Jakarta LRT Indonesia
 Taoyuan Metro Taiwan 
 SNCFT Tunisia
 Warsaw Trams 123 tram vehicles (bi- and unidirectional)

Projects

Hyderabad Metro 
Hyderabad Metro Rail announced on September 12, 2012 that it has awarded the rolling stock tender to Hyundai Rotem of South Korea. The tender is for 57 rakes consisting of 171 cars which will delivered phase wise at least 9 months before the commencement of each stage. On 22 May 2014 the first train had arrived at Uppal depot in Hyderabad.
On 31 December 2014, Hyderabad Metro created a new technology record by successfully running a train in Automatic Train Operation (ATO) mode for the first time on Indian soil between Nagole and Mettuguda.

Istanbul Marmaray 
Hyundai Rotem announced on November 11, 2008, that it had signed a €580m contract to supply the rolling stock for the Marmaray cross-Bosporus tunnel project in Istanbul. The Korean firm saw off competition from short-listed bidders Alstom, CAF and a consortium of Bombardier, Siemens and Nurol for the 440-vehicle contract which was placed by the Ministry of Transport's General Directorate of Railways, Harbours & Airports.

The 22 m long stainless steel cars will be formed into 10 and five-car EMUs. Some production will be carried out locally by Eurotem, Hyundai Rotem's joint venture with Turkish rolling stock manufacturer TÜVASAŞ. The cars will arrive in three batches, the first 160 cars by 2011, the last by June 2014.

Hyundai Rotem won its first contract in Turkey in 1996, and has now completed seven orders for a total of 804 vehicles worth US$1·6bn. In July it signed a contract to provide 84 DMUs in conjunction with Tüvasas.

'Hyundai Rotem has earned the trust of Turkey by providing high quality products and technology', said Executive Vice-Chairman Yeo-Sung Lee. 'We believe this brightens the outlook for future business opportunities in Turkey such as the Istanbul line and the Ankara line.'

Boston MBTA 
Hyundai Rotem was awarded a contract with Boston's MBTA in early 2008 for the construction of 75 cars. The contract entails the delivery of the first 4 cars by October 2010 while the remaining 71 cars were scheduled to be delivered by the end of 2012. However, due to chronic delays, shoddy workmanship, material shortage, and the death of Hyundai Rotem's chief executive, M.H. Lee, in November 2012, only four cars have been delivered by the end of 2012. On December 21, 2012, the MBTA sent a letter to Hyundai Rotem threatening to cancel the contract if a solution is not soon reached, which, would be a breach of the contract terms. Since then, the new cars have continued to experience various mechanical problems resulting in car shortages and delays.

See also 
 Economy of South Korea
 Dawonsys
 Bombardier Transportation
 Siemens Mobility

References

External links 
 Hyundai Rotem web site 

Defence companies of South Korea
Engineering companies of South Korea
Locomotive manufacturers of South Korea
Rail infrastructure manufacturers
Rail vehicle manufacturers of South Korea
Vehicle manufacturing companies established in 1970
South Korean brands
Hyundai Motor Group
Military vehicle manufacturers
South Korean companies established in 1970